Athrips syncopaula is a moth of the family Gelechiidae. It is found in South Africa.

The wingspan is about 16 mm. The forewings are greyish suffused ochreous-brown and thickly sprinkled dark fuscous. The discal stigmata form small irregular rather dark fuscous spots with smaller obscure pale spots adjacent on the internal side. The hindwings are light grey.

References

Endemic moths of South Africa
Moths described in 1937
Athrips
Moths of Africa